Android in La La Land is a 2016 documentary film about musician Gary Numan, focusing on his attempts to return to the US and his move to Los Angeles, California (the "La La Land" in the documentary title).  It was directed by Steve Read and Rob Alexander.

Plot 
The documentary follows Numan for an entire year on his move to the US to try and become successful in that market, launch a career in Hollywood and go back to the studio to record after an absence of nearly ten years.

References

External links 
 
 4 Star Review - The Guardian
 BBC Review
 Rotten Tomatoes

2016 documentary films